The 315th Weapons Squadron is a United States Air Force unit, assigned to the USAF Weapons School at Nellis Air Force Base, Nevada.  It is responsible for training a tactics development for the Air Force's intercontinental ballistic missile force.  From 1958 through the early 1990s, it was the primary missile training activity for Strategic Air Command as the 4315th Combat Crew Training Squadron.

History
Established as the first USAF intercontinental ballistic missile (ICBM) training squadron at Cooke Air Force Base California in May 1958.  As the 4315th Student Squadron, and later 4315th Combat Crew Training Squadron, the unit was responsible for implementing the Strategic Air Command missile combat crew training program. All USAF ICBM crew personnel (Atlas, Titan I, Titan II, Minuteman I,II, II) up to the inactivation of the 4315th in July 1993 were trained at one time or another by this unit.  In 1993, Air Education and Training Command assumed the crew training role from Air Combat Command and activated the 381st Training Group to replace the 4315th.

Re-established as the 315th Weapons Squadron as part of the USAF Weapons School at Nellis Air Force Base, Nevada in 2012.  Provides the ICBM Weapons Instructor Course.

Lineage
 Designated as the 4315th Student Squadron and organized on 1 May 1958
 Redesignated 4315th Combat Crew Training Squadron on 14 May 1963
 Inactivated 1 July 1993
 Redesignated 315th Weapons Squadron on 20 January 2012
 Activated on 2 March 2012

Assignments
 392d Air Base Group, 1 May 1958
 704th Strategic Missile Wing, 15 November 1958
 1st Missile Division (later 1st Strategic Aerospace Division), 1 July 1959
 392d Strategic Missile Wing, 18 October 1961
 1st Strategic Aerospace Division, 20 December 1961
 Fifteenth Air Force, 31 March 1970
 1st Strategic Aerospace Division (later Strategic Missile Center), 4 January 1975
 310th Operations Group, 1 September 1991 – 1 July 1993
 USAF Weapons School, 2 March 2012 – present

Stations
 Cooke Air Force Base (later Vandenberg Air Force Base), California, 1 May 1958 – 1 July 1993
 Nellis Air Force Base, Nevada, 2 March 2012 – present

References

Notes

Bibliography

External links

Weapons squadrons of the United States Air Force